Rhadicoleptus is a genus of insects belonging to the family Limnephilidae.

The species of this genus are found in Europe.

Species:
 Rhadicoleptus alpestris (Kolenati, 1848) 
 Rhadicoleptus spinifer (McLachlan, 1875) 
 Rhadicoleptus ucenorum (McLachlan, 1876)

References

Limnephilidae
Insects of Europe
Trichoptera genera